= Glass melting =

Glass melting might refer to:

- Commercial glass melting using fossil fuels
- Commercial electric glass melting
- Glass melting in the laboratory
